Nelson County Courthouse is a historic courthouse located at Lovingston, Nelson County, Virginia within the Lovingston Historic District. The original building opened in 1810.  It is a rectangular, two-story stuccoed brick structure, with two additions: one of ten feet attached to the rear of the original structure and the other is a large lateral wing across the rear of the first addition. Both of these additions were constructed in 1940. The original structure was partially remodeled in 1968.  It contains one large courtroom with a spectator gallery towards the rear.  It was the first public building to be built after Nelson County's organization in 1807.

It was listed on the National Register of Historic Places in 1973.

Gallery

References

External links
Nelson County Courthouse, U.S. Route 29, Lovingston, Nelson County, VA: 2 photos, 2 data pages, at Historic American Buildings Survey

Historic American Buildings Survey in Virginia
National Register of Historic Places in Nelson County, Virginia
Buildings and structures in Nelson County, Virginia
County courthouses in Virginia
Government buildings completed in 1810
Georgian architecture in Virginia
Courthouses on the National Register of Historic Places in Virginia
Individually listed contributing properties to historic districts on the National Register in Virginia